The R880 or Patuakhali-Amtali-Barguna-Kakchira Highway is a transportation artery in Bangladesh, which connects National Highway N8 (at Patuakhali town) with Zilla Highway Z8708 (at Kakchira).

See also 
 N8 (Bangladesh)
 List of roads in Bangladesh

References 

Regional Highways in Bangladesh